Parkesburg station is an Amtrak train station located at West First Avenue and South Culvert Street in Parkesburg, Pennsylvania. It is served by most Amtrak Keystone Service trains. A station building exists at the stop, but is not currently used as a ticket office. Parkesburg has two low-level side platforms; a center track is not used for passenger service.

History
From  until 1972, Parkesburg Tower was located near the Atlantic Avenue bridge. The tower served as a communication/signalling point for westbound (to Lancaster and beyond) trains, and a routing location for eastbound trains entering the Main Line of the Pennsylvania Railroad. A small service yard was also located nearby for both track service and to assist with sideling switching. Parkesburg Station once was the westernmost stop for the SEPTA R5 commuter line from April 2, 1990 (now the Paoli/Thorndale Line). It was truncated to Downingtown November 10, 1996 because of the need for trains to deadhead to Lancaster to turn around. It has since been re-extended to Thorndale, a few miles west of Downingtown.

In 1984, the station appeared in the movie Witness.

References

External links 

Parkesburg Amtrak Station (USA RailGuide -- TrainWeb)

Amtrak stations in Pennsylvania
Railway stations in Chester County, Pennsylvania
Former Pennsylvania Railroad stations
Former SEPTA Regional Rail stations
Philadelphia to Harrisburg Main Line